Cecil Brown (born July 3, 1943) is an African-American writer and educator. He is a published novelist, short story writer, script writer, and college educator. His noted works include The Life and Loves of Mr. Jiveass Nigger (1969) and work on the 1977 Richard Pryor film Which Way Is Up? as a screenwriter.

Biography
Born in rural Bolton, North Carolina, Brown attended North Carolina Agricultural and Technical State University of Greensboro, North Carolina, where he earned his B.A. in English in 1966. He later attended Columbia University, and earned his M.A. degree from the University of Chicago in 1967. Brown while residing in Berkeley, California (to which he returned in the late 1980s and still lives and works), earned his Ph.D. in African American Studies, Folklore and Narrative in 1993. He is a professor at UC Berkeley.

Works

 The Life and Loves of Mr. Jiveass Nigger (1969), 
 Pryor Lives (1969)
 Days without Weather (1983) 
 Coming Up Down Home (1993) 
 I, Stagolee (1993)
 Stagolee Shot Billy (2003), 
 Dude, Where's My Black Studies Department? (2007), 
 Journey's End (2007),

Awards
 Columbia University English Dept., Professor John Angus Burrell Memorial Prize, 1966
 Before Columbus Foundation American Book Award for Days Without Weather, 1984
 Berlin Literary Fellowship, 1985; Besonders Wertvoll Film Preises, 1986
 UC Berkeley, Mentor Fellowship, 1992

References

External links
 

Living people
American writers
1943 births
American Book Award winners
20th-century American male writers
20th-century African-American writers
21st-century African-American people
African-American male writers